Ferdinand II is the name of:
 Ferdinand II of León (1132–1188), king from 1157
 Fernando II, Duke of Braganza (1430–1483), also known as Ferdinand II (1430–e.1483)
 Ferdinand II of Aragon (1452–1516), the Catholic, king of Aragon from 1479, of Sicily from 1468; Ferdinand V of Castile 1474–1504 and Ferdinand III of Naples 1504–1516
 Ferdinand II of Naples (1469–1496), also known as Ferrandino, king from 1495
 Ferdinand II, Archduke of Austria (1529–1595), archduke, Regent of Tyrol and Further Austria, ruled from 1564
 Ferdinand II, Holy Roman Emperor (1578–1637), also known as Ferdinand II of Germany, emperor from 1619
 Ferdinando II de' Medici, Grand Duke of Tuscany (1610–1670), Grand Duke of Tuscany from 1620
 Ferdinand II of the Two Sicilies (1810–1859), king from 1830
 Fernando II of Portugal (1816–1885), king 1837–1853

de:Liste der Herrscher namens Ferdinand#Ferdinand II.
eo:Ferdinando (regantoj)#Ferdinando la 2-a